The Khazar hypothesis of Ashkenazi ancestry, often called the Khazar myth by its critics, is a largely abandoned historical hypothesis. The hypothesis postulated that Ashkenazi Jews were primarily, or to a large extent, descended from Khazars, a multi-ethnic conglomerate of mostly Turkic peoples who formed a semi-nomadic khanate in and around the northern and central Caucasus and the Pontic–Caspian steppe. The hypothesis also postulated that after collapse of the Khazar empire, the Khazars fled to Eastern Europe and made up a large part of the Jews there. The hypothesis draws on some medieval sources such as the Khazar Correspondence, according to which at some point in the 8th–9th centuries, a small number of Khazars were said by Judah Halevi and Abraham ibn Daud to have converted to Rabbinic Judaism. The scope of the conversion within the Khazar Khanate  remains uncertain, but the evidence used to tie the Ashkenazi communities to the Khazars is meager and subject to conflicting interpretations.

Genetic studies on Jews have found no substantive evidence of a Khazar origin among Ashkenazi Jews. Doron Behar and other geneticists have concluded that such a link is unlikely, noting that it is difficult to test the Khazar hypothesis using genetics because there is lack of clear modern descendants of the Khazars that could provide a clear test of the contribution to Ashkenazi Jewish ancestry, but found no genetic markers in Ashkenazi Jews that would link them to peoples of the Caucasus/Khazar area. This and other studies have instead found evidence that the Ashkenazi have mixed Near Eastern and Southern European/Mediterranean origins.

Although the majority of contemporary geneticists who have published on the topic dismiss it, there are some who defend its plausibility. In the late 19th century, Ernest Renan and other scholars speculated that the Ashkenazi Jews of Europe originated among Turkic refugees who had migrated from the collapsed Khazarian Khanate westward into Europe, and exchanged their native Khazar language for Yiddish while continuing to practice Judaism. Though intermittently evoked by several scholars since that time, the Khazar-Ashkenazi hypothesis came to the attention of a much wider public with the publication of Arthur Koestler's The Thirteenth Tribe in 1976. It has been revived recently by geneticist Eran Elhaik, who in 2012 conducted a study aiming to vindicate it.

The hypothesis has been abused at times by anti-Zionists to challenge the idea that Jews have ties to ancient Israel, and it has also played some role in antisemitic theories propounded by fringe groups of American racists, Russian nationalists and the Christian identity movement. The term "Khazarian Mafia" sometimes is used by antisemitic media as a derogatory term for Jews, especially in connection with conspiracy theories such as 9/11.

History

1806–1918
Some sources attribute to the Ukrainian Rabbi Isaac Baer Levinsohn (1788–1860) the first reference of a connection between the Ashkenazi Jews and the Khazars. Levinsohn also recorded that the tradition of their forefathers was that Ashkenazi Jews had earlier spoken Russian before acquiring Yiddish. The hypothesis was advanced in 1808 by Johann Ewers, in the context of an early controversy over the foundations of the Russian state, which pitted scholars espousing a Norman origin for the Varangians against those who argued that these founders of the Kievan Rus' were Slavic and indigenous. Ewers proposed the idea that the Viking/Varangian founders were in fact Khazars. The Russian historian Nikolay Karamzin advanced the claim, asserting that considerable numbers of Khazars had left Khazaria for Kievan Rus' in the time of Vladimir I (980–1015). The German Orientalist Karl Neumann suggested as early as 1847 that the migration of Khazars might have contributed to the formation of the core population of the Jews of Eastern Europe, without however specifying whether he was referring to Judaizing Turks or ethnic Jewish residents of Khazaria.

Subsequently, Abraham Eliyahu Harkavi suggested in 1869 that there might be a link between the Khazars and European Jews. Three years later, however, in 1872, a Crimean Karaite, Abraham Firkovich, alternatively proclaimed that the members of his Turkic-speaking sect were descended from Turkic converts to Judaism. This hypothesis, that the descendants of Khazar converts to Judaism formed a major proportion of Ashkenazim, was first proposed to a Western public by Ernest Renan in 1883. In a lecture delivered in Paris before the Cercle du Saint-Simon on 27 January 1883, Renan argued that conversion played a significant role in the formation of the Jewish people, stating that:
This conversion of the kingdom of the Khazars has a considerable importance regarding the origin of those Jews who dwell in the countries along the Danube and southern Russia. These regions enclose great masses of Jewish populations which have in all probability nothing or almost nothing that is anthropologically Jewish in them.

The lively discussions of this thesis in the 19th century in Eastern Europe diminished as fears that both Russian nationalism and Jewish Ashkenazi identity might be compromised by it led to a suppression of research. Rabbi Samuel Kohn in 1884, as Magyarization proved increasingly popular among Hungarian Jews, argued that they, like Hungarian Christians, shared a common ethnic descent from the intermarriage of Khazars and Magyars.

Renan's thesis found an echo soon after, in 1885, when Isidore Loeb, a rabbi, historian and secretary of the Alliance Israélite Universelle, in arguing for the cause of Jewish emancipation, challenged the notion that nations were based on races, and the Jews therefore, could be excluded as alien. To the contrary, he argued, they were no different from other peoples and nations, all of which arose from miscegenation: the Jews were no exception, and one could assume, he added, that many German and Russian Jews descended from the Khazars.

Occasional suggestions emerged that there was a small Khazar component in East European Jews in works by Joseph Jacobs (1886), Anatole Leroy-Beaulieu (1893), Maksymilian Ernest Gumplowicz, and by the Russian-Jewish anthropologist Samuel Weissenberg.

Leroy-Beaulieu, a critic of antisemitism who perhaps drew on Renan, queried whether or not thousands of Polish and Russian Jews might have their origins traced back to the "old nomads of the steppes."

In 1909 Hugo von Kutschera developed the notion into a book-length study, arguing that Khazars formed the foundational core of the modern Ashkenazi. Maurice Fishberg introduced the notion to an American audience in 1911 in his book, The Jews: A Study of Race and Environment.

When at the Versailles Peace Conference, a Jewish Zionist called Palestine the land of the Jewish people's ancestors, Joseph Reinach, a French Jewish member of parliament who was opposed to Zionism, dismissed the idea, arguing that Jews descended from Israelites were a tiny minority. In his view, conversion had played a major role in the expansion of the Jewish people, and, in addition, he claimed, the majority of "Russian, Polish and Galician Jews descend from the Khazars, a Tatar people from the south of Russia who converted to Judaism en masse at the time of Charlemagne."

Interwar years, 1918–1939
The idea was also taken up by the Polish-Jewish economic historian and General Zionist Yitzhak Schipper in 1918, by the anthropologist Roland B. Dixon (1923) and writer H. G. Wells (1921), who used it to argue that "The main part of Jewry never was in Judea", a thesis that was to have a political echo in later opinion. In 1931 Sigmund Freud wrote to Max Eitingon that the sculptor Oscar Nemon, for whom he was sitting, showed the lineaments of a "Slavic Eastern Jew, Khazar or Kalmuck or something like that".

In 1932, Samuel Krauss ventured the theory that the biblical Ashkenaz referred to northern Asia Minor, and he identified it with the Khazars, a position immediately disputed by Jacob Mann.

This interwar period consolidated also a belief, originally developed by the Russian Orientalists V.V. Grigor’iev and V.D. Smirnov, that the East European congregations of the Karaite sect of Judaism were descendants of Turkic Khazars. The idea of a Khazarian origin of the Karaites was then adopted as their official viewpoint. Seraja Szapszal (1873–1961), from 1927, the ḥakham of the Polish-Lithuanian Karaite community had begun to implement a thorough-going reform policy of dejudaizing Karaite culture and traditions and transforming along Turkic lines. As a secular Jew and orientalist he was influenced by Atatürk's reforms, and his policy was dictated by several considerations: Jews were suffering from harassment in public and private in Eastern Europe; he wished to forestall the threat he had intuited was imminent in both Fascism and Nazism, which were beginning to gain a foothold; he was passionate about the Karaites' language, Karaim, and its Turkish tradition, and somewhat insouciant of the Judaic heritage of his people. In 1934 Corrado Gini, a distinguished statistician, interested also in demography and anthropology, with close ties to the fascist elite, led an expedition in August–October 1934 to survey the Karaites. He concluded that Karaites were ethnically mixed, predominantly Chuvash which he mistook to be Finno-Ugric descendants of the Tauro-Cimmerians who at one point had been absorbed into the Khazars who for Gini however were not Turkic. A further conclusion was that the Ashkenazi arose from ‘Turko-Tatar converts to Judaism.’ Though the Khazar-Karaite theory is unsubstantiated by any historical evidence, - the early Karaite literature speaks of Khazars as mamzerim, 'bastards' or 'strangers' within Judaism - this myth served a political purpose, of taking that community out of the stranglehold of antisemitic regulations and prejudices directed generally against Jews in Eastern Europe.

1939–1945
In 1943, Abraham N. Polak (sometimes referred to as Poliak), later professor of the history of the Middle Ages at Tel Aviv University, published a Hebrew monograph in which he concluded that the East European Jews came from Khazaria.

In Nazi Germany, unlike most race theorists in Germany down to his time Hans F. K. Günther argued that the Jews were not a pure race, although he nevertheless considered them to be highly inbred. He argued that the Ashkenazi were a mix of Near Eastern, Oriental, East Baltic, Eastern, Inner-Asian, Nordic, Hamite, and Negro peoples and separate from the Sephardim. Günther believed that the conversion of the Khazars, whom he took to have been a Near Eastern race constituted a further external element in the racial makeup of the Ashkenazi Jews, strengthening its Near Eastern component. Günther's theorizing about racial consequences flowing from the conversion of the Khazars was embraced by Gerhard Kittel.

The Karaite claim not to be ethnic Jews, but descendants of the Khazars, was eventually accepted by the Nazis who exempted them, unlike the Crimean Krymchaks with whom they had historic ties, from the policy of genocidal extermination on these grounds.

1946–1949
In debates leading up to the UN plan in 1947 to partition Palestine into Jewish and Arab states, the British politicians John Hope Simpson and Edward Spears, intent on denying Zionism that part of its claim that drew on biblical arguments, asserted that Jewish immigrants to Mandatory Palestine were the descendants of pagan converts and not of the Israelites. The approach was one shared by both gentile and Jewish anti-Zionists. Rory Miller claims that their denial of lineal descent from Israelites drew on the Khazar theory.

In anti-Zionist argumentation delivered at the UN in 1947 Faris al-Khoury and Jamal Al-Husseini used the theory to oppose the creation of a Jewish state on racial and historic grounds. Cecil Hourani claimed that the Arab leaders had been convinced of the value of the argument by Benjamin H. Freedman. Internal British documents seem to support the claim. It would later play a role in Arab anti-Zionist polemics, taking on an antisemitic edge, though Bernard Lewis, noted in 1987 that serious Arab scholars had dropped it, remarked that it only occasionally emerged in Arab political polemics.

1950–1976
D.M. Dunlop, writing in 1954, thought very little evidence backed what he regarded as a mere assumption, and argued that the Ashkenazi-Khazar descent hypothesis went far beyond what "our imperfect records" permit.

Léon Poliakov, while assuming the Jews of Western Europe resulted from a "panmixia" in the first millennium, on the basis of serology research showing their blood types overlapped with those of other European populations, asserted in 1955 that it was widely assumed that Europe's Eastern Jews descended from a mixture of Khazarian and German Jews. Polak's work found some support from Salo Wittmayer Baron and Ben-Zion Dinur, but was dismissed by Bernard Weinryb as a fiction (1962).

In 1957 Salo Wittmayer Baron, called by his biographer an "architect of Jewish history", devoted a large part of a chapter in his Social and Religious History of the Jews to the Khazarian Jewish state, and the impact he believed that community exercised on the formation of East European Jewries in his Social and Religious History of the Jews (1957). The scarcity of direct Jewish testimonies did not disconcert Baron: this was to be expected since medieval Jews were "generally inarticulate outside their main centers of learning". The Khazarian turn to Judaism was, he judged, the "largest and last mass conversion", involving both the royal house and large sectors of the population. Jews migrated there to flee the recurrent intolerance against Jews and the geopolitical upheavals of the region's chronic wars, which often proved devastating to northern Asia Minor, between Byzantium, Sassanid Persia, and the Abbasid and Umayyad Caliphates.

For Baron, the fact of Jewish Khazaria played a lively role in stirring up among Western Jews an image of "red Jews", and among Jews in Islamic countries a beacon of hope. After the dissolution of Khazaria, Baron sees a diaspora drifting both north into Russia, Poland and Ukraine, and westwards into Pannonia and the Balkans. where their cultivated presence both established Jewish communities and paved the way, ironically, for the Slavonic conversion to Christianity. By the 11th and 12th centuries, these Eastern Jews make their first appearance in the Jewish literature of France and Germany. Maimonides, bemoaning the neglect of learning in the East, laid his hopes for the perpetuation of Jewish learning in the young struggling communities of Europe but would, Baron concludes, have been surprised to find that within centuries precisely in Eastern Europe would arise thriving communities that were to assume leadership of the Jewish people itself.

1976-2019

Koestler, The Thirteenth Tribe and contemporary views
The Khazar-Ashkenazi hypothesis came to the attention of a much wider public with the publication of Arthur Koestler's The Thirteenth Tribe, which made sweeping claims for a Khazar legacy among the Ashkenazi in 1976, including the argument that the Jews could not have reached 8 million in Eastern Europe without the contribution of the Khazars. Koestler's ideas drew on Hungarian Jewish speculations about their own origins. His book was both positively and negatively reviewed. Israel's ambassador to Britain branded it "an anti-Semitic action financed by the Palestinians", while Bernard Lewis claimed that the idea was not supported by any evidence whatsoever, and had been "abandoned by all serious scholars". Raphael Patai, however, registered some support for the idea that Khazar remnants had played a role in the growth of Eastern European Jewish communities, and several amateur researchers, such as Boris Altschüler (1994) and Kevin Alan Brook, kept the thesis in the public eye. Brook's views evolved as new data became available: in the first edition of his book (1999), he contended that about one-fourth of Ashkenazic ancestry may trace back to the Khazars, whereas in the second edition (2006) he regarded the Khazar contribution as "small" and in the third edition (2018) he argued against any Khazar contribution. Koestler argued that the Khazar theory would mitigate European racially based antisemitism.

In 2007, Peter Golden suggested that at least some of the Ashkenazi Jews of Hungary in particular (along with some Hungarians) might have inherited a minority of their ancestry from Khazar remnants that migrated west.

The theory has been used to counter the concept of Jewish nationhood. It has been revived recently in a variety of approaches, from linguistics (Paul Wexler) to historiography (Shlomo Sand) and population genetics (Eran Elhaik). In broad academic perspective, both the idea that the Khazars converted en masse to Judaism, and the suggestion that they emigrated to form the core population of Ashkenazi Jewry, remain highly polemical issues.

In June 2014, Shaul Stampfer published a paper challenging the Khazar hypothesis as ungrounded in sources contemporary with the Khazar period, stating: "Such a conversion, even though it’s a wonderful story, never happened".

Genetics and the Khazar theory

Before modern DNA population genetics entered the field, Raphael Patai described the Khazars in racial terms as being a Turkic people with some Mongoloid admixture. After major advances in DNA sequence analysis and computing technology in the late 20th and early 21st century, a plethora of genetic research on Jewish and other human populations has been conducted worldwide. Summing up the results in 2015, the Yiddish scholar Alexander Beider stated that genetic studies often resulted in contradictory outcomes, complicated at times by the political or religious views of some researchers.

In 2000, science journalist Nicholas Wade interpreted a genetics paper on Ashkenazi Y-chromosome lineages as refuting theories that the Ashkenazi were descendants of converts generally or of the Khazars specifically.

The following year, in 2001, In 2001 Nebel et al., summarizing studies that reported a low-level European gene flow contributing to Ashkenazi paternal gene pool, suggested this influence might be reflected in the Eu 19 chromosomes common in Eastern Europe, or otherwise, that Ashkenazim with this component might descend from Khazars, an hypothesis the authors found "attractive". 

In 2008, in a book entitled Jacob's Legacy: A Genetic View of Jewish History , David Goldstein stated that despite his initial skepticism regarding Koestler's thesis, the certainty underlying his dismissal had been undermined when he considered that a hypothetical Khazar connection struck him as no more far-fetched than what had emerged in genetics concerning the apparent 'spectacular continuity of the Cohen line ' or the discovery of what seemed to be Jewish genetic signatures among the Bantu Lemba. In his view, the idea had a degree of plausibility, if not likely.

In 2013 Martin B. Richards stated that presently available genetic studies shows that 50-80 percent of Ashkenazi Y chromosome DNA could be traced to the Near East, while his own study at the University of Huddersfield found that 80 percent of Ashkenazi mitochondrial DNA could be traced to Europe, but with virtually no lineages from the North Caucasus. This implied a trend of European women marrying Near Eastern men, but provided no evidence to support the Khazar hypothesis. The claim that Ashkenazis as a whole take their origin from Khazars has been widely criticized as there is no direct evidence to support it. Using four Jewish groups, one being Ashkenazi, Kopelman et al found no evidence for the Khazar theory.

While the consensus in genetic research is that the world's Jewish populations (including the Ashkenazim) share substantial genetic ancestry derived from a common Ancient Middle Eastern founder population, and that Ashkenazi Jews have no genetic ancestry attributable to Khazars, at least one study authored in this period diverges from the majority view in favor of the Khazar theory.

Some evidence suggests a close relationship of Jewish patrilineages (including those of the Ashkenazi, Sephardi, Iraqi and Moroccan Jews) with those of the Samaritans, with some lineages sharing a common ancestry projected to the time of the Assyrian conquest of the kingdom of Israel.

Behar et al. studies
According to a 2010 study by Doron Behar et al., Ashkenazi Jews form a "tight cluster" overlying non-Jewish samples from the Levant with Sephardic, Middle Eastern and North African Jewish populations and Samaritans, results being ”consistent with an historical formulation of the Jewish people as descending from ancient Hebrew and Israelite residents of the Levant”. In 2013 Behar et al. published a genetic study that came up with the conclusion that there isn't genetic evidence for the Khazar origin of Ashkenazi Jews, and instead Ashkenazi Jews are genetically closest to other Jewish groups and non-Jewish Middle Eastern and European populations.

Studies on Ashkenazi Levites
A 2003 study by Behar et al., found that Haplogroup R1a1a (R-M17) is present in over 50% of Ashkenazi Levites (who comprise 4% of the Ashkenazi Jewish population). In 2008 David Goldstein asserted that based on the study a Khazar connection "now seems to me plausible, if not likely". Faerman (2008) states that "External low-level gene flow of possible Eastern European origin has been shown in Ashkenazim but no evidence of a hypothetical Khazars' contribution to the Ashkenazi gene pool has ever been found.".

However, Behar and others made two more genetic studies on Ashkenazi Levites ending up with a different conclusion. The results of these studies showed that the R1a haplogroup present in Ashkenazi Levites is R1a-M582/R1a-Y2619 rather than R1a1a and originated in the Near East instead of Eastern Europe and was "likely a minor haplogroup among the Hebrews".

A 2013 study by Rootsi, Behar et al. of Ashkenazi Levites found a high frequency of haplogroup R1a-M582 among them (64.9% of Ashkenazi Levites) pointing to a founding event and paternal ancestor common to half of them. Since R1a shows high frequency in Eastern Europe generally, it was thought possible, that the evidence might indicate the founder was a non-Jewish European. Testing the 3 hypotheses of a European, a Near Eastern or a Khazarian origin, their data excluded both the European and Khazarian origin of a Levite founder since they found no evidence of R1a-M582 Y-chromosomes was found in either group, other than singletons, while it occurs with significant frequency in Near Eastern regions Iranian Kerman, Iranian Azeri, the Kurds from Cilician Anatolia and Kazakhstan, and among Ashkenazi and non-Ashkenazi Jews. R1a-M582 was not detected among data from Iraqi, Bedouins, Druze and Palestinians sampled in Israel.

A 2017 study by Behar, concentrating on the Ashkenazi Levites (themselves about where the proportion reaches 50%), while signalling that there's a "rich variation of haplogroup R1a outside of Europe which is phylogenetically separate from the typically European R1a branches", precises that the particular R1a-Y2619 sub-clade testifies for a local origin, and that the "Middle Eastern origin of the Ashkenazi Levite lineage based on what was previously a relatively limited number of reported samples, can now be considered firmly validated."

Elhaik et al. studies
Eran Elhaik argued in 2012 that:

"Strong evidence for the Khazarian hypothesis is the clustering of European Jews with the populations that in his opinion resided on opposite ends of ancient Khazaria: Armenians, Georgians, and Azerbaijani Jews. Because Caucasus populations remained relatively isolated in the Caucasus region and because there are no records of Caucasus populations mass-migrating to Eastern and Central Europe prior to the fall of Khazaria (Balanovsky et al. 2011), these findings imply a shared origin for European Jews and Caucasus populations."

In later publications, Elhaik and his team modified their theory, proposing simply that the Judaised Khazar kingdom was a core transit area for a federation of Jewish merchants of mixed Iranian, Turkish and Slavic origins who, when that empire collapsed, relocated to Europe.

Furthermore, in the 2016 study Das, Elhaik, Wexler et al. argued that the first Ashkenazi populations to speak the Yiddish language came from areas near four villages in Eastern Turkey along the Silk Road whose names derived from the word "Ashkenaz," rather than from Germanic lands as is the general consensus in scholarship. They proposed that Iranians, Greeks, Turks, and Slavs converted to Judaism in Anatolia prior to migrating to Khazaria where a small-scale conversion had already occurred. The historian Bernard Spolsky commenting on Elhaik's earlier study wrote. “Recently, Elhaik (2013) claims to have found evidence supporting the Khazarian origin of Ashkenazim, but the whole issue of genetic evidence remains uncertain.”

In 2018, Elhaik stated that the Ashkenazi maternal line is European and that only 3% of Ashkenazi DNA shows links with the Eastern Mediterranean/Middle East, a 'minuscule' amount comparable to the proportion of Neanderthal genes in modern European populations. For Elhaik, the vehicle by which unique Asiatic variations on Ashkenazi Y-chromosomes occurred, with Haplogroup Q-L275, was the Ashina ruling clan of the Göktürks, who converted to Judaism and established the Khazar empire.

Criticism of the Elhaik studies
Elhaik's 2012 study proved highly controversial. Several noted geneticists, among them Marcus Feldman, Harry Ostrer, Doron Behar, and Michael Hammer have maintained — and the view has gained widespread support among scientists — that the worldwide Jewish population is related and shares common roots in the Middle East, Feldman stated Elhaik's statistical analysis would not pass muster with most scientists; Hammer affirmed it was an outlier minority view without scientific support. Elhaik in reply described the group as ‘liars’ and ‘frauds’, noting Ostrer would not share genetic data that might be used ‘to defame the Jewish people’. Elhaik's PhD supervisor Dan Graur, likewise dismissed them as a ‘clique’, and said Elhaik is ‘combative’ which is what science itself is.

Elhaik's 2012 study was specifically criticized for its use of Armenians and Azerbaijani Jews as proxies for Khazars and for using Bedouin and Jordanian Hashemites as a proxy for the Ancient Israelites. The former decision was criticized because Armenians were assumed to have a monolithic Caucasian ancestry, when as an Anatolian people (rather than Turkic) they contain many genetically Middle Eastern elements. Azerbaijani Jews are also assumed for the purposes of the study to have Khazarian ancestry, when Mountain Jews are actually descended from Persian Jews. The decision to cast Bedouin/Hashemites as "proto-Jews" was especially seen as political in nature, considering that both have origins in Arab tribes from the Arabian Peninsula rather than from the Ancient Israelites, while the descent of the Jews from the Israelites is largely accepted.

Geneticists conducting studies in Jewish genetics have challenged Elhaik's methods in his first paper. Michael Hammer called Elhaik's premise "unrealistic," calling Elhaik and other Khazarian hypothesis proponents "outlier folks… who have a minority view that’s not supported scientifically. I think the arguments they make are pretty weak and stretching what we know." Marcus Feldman, director of Stanford University's Morrison Institute for Population and Resource Studies, echoes Hammer. "If you take all of the careful genetic population analysis that has been done over the last 15 years… there’s no doubt about the common Middle Eastern origin," he said. He added that Elhaik's first paper "is sort of a one-off." Elhaik's statistical analysis would not pass muster with most contemporary scholars, Feldman said: "He appears to be applying the statistics in a way that gives him different results from what everybody else has obtained from essentially similar data."

Das, Elhaik and Wexler's 2016 study was challenged by the historian of Soviet and East European Jewry Shaul Stampfer, who dismissed it as 'basically nonsense', and the demographer Sergio DellaPergola, who claimed it was a "falsification", whose methodology was defective in using a small population size and failing to factor in the genetic profiles of other Jews such as the Sephardic Jews to whom the Ashkenazi Jews are closely related. Elhaik replied that factoring in the DNA of non-Ashkenazic Jews would not alter the genetic profile of Ashkenazi Jews, and that his team remained the largest genomic study of the latter to date, and the first to target Yiddish speakers. The Yiddish scholar Marion Aptroot states "Seen from the standpoint of the humanities, certain aspects of the article by Das et al. fall short of established standards."

Recently, a study by a team of biologists and linguists, led by Pavel Flegontov, a specialist in genomics, published a response to Das, Elhaik and Wexler's 2016 study, criticizing their methodology and conclusions. They argue that GPS works to allow inferences for the origins of modern populations with an unadmixed genome, but not for tracing ancestries back 1,000 years ago. In their view, the paper tried to fit Wexler's 'marginal and unsupported interpretation' of Yiddish into a model that only permits valid deductions for recent unadmixed populations. They also criticized the linguistic aspect of the study on the grounds that "all methods of historical linguistics concur that Yiddish is a Germanic language, with no reliable evidence for Slavic, Iranian, or Turkic substrata." They further describe the purported "Slavo-Iranian confederation" as "a historically meaningless term invented by the authors under review."

Alexander Beider also takes issue with Elhaik's findings on linguistic grounds, similarly arguing that Yiddish onomastics lacks traces of a Turkic component. He concludes that theories of a Khazar connection are either speculative or simply wrong and "cannot be taken seriously."

Antisemitism

United Kingdom and United States
Maurice Fishberg and Roland B. Dixon's works were later exploited in racist and religious polemical literature, by advocates of British Israelism, in both Britain and the United States. Particularly after the publication of Burton J. Hendrick ‘s The Jews in America (1923) it began to enjoy a vogue among advocates of immigration restrictions in the 1920s; racial theorists like Lothrop Stoddard; antisemitic conspiracy theorists such as the Ku Klux Klan’s Hiram Wesley Evans; and anti-communist polemicists such as John O. Beaty

In 1938, Ezra Pound, then strongly identifying with the Fascist regime of Benito Mussolini, sent a query to fellow poet Louis Zukofsky concerning the Khazars after someone had written to him claiming that the ancient Jews had died out and that modern Jews were of Khazar descent. He returned to the issue in 1955, apparently influenced by a book called Facts are Facts, which pushed the Jewish-Khazar descent theory, and which for Pound had dug up "a few savoury morsels". The booklet in question, by a Roman Catholic convert from Rabbinic Judaism, Benjamin H. Freedman, was an antisemitic tirade written to David Goldstein after the latter had converted to Catholicism.

John O. Beaty was an antisemitic, McCarthyite professor of Old English at SMU, author of The Iron Curtain over America (Dallas 1952). According to him, "the Khazar Jews were responsible for all of America's – and the world's ills," beginning with World War I. The book had little impact until the former Wall Street broker and oil tycoon J. Russell Maguire promoted it. A similar position was adopted by Wilmot Robertson, whose views influenced David Duke. The British author Douglas Reed has also been influential. In his work the Ashkenazi are false Jews, descendants of the Khazars.

A number of different variants of the theory came to be exploited by the Christian Identity movement. The Christian Identity movement, which took shape from the 1940s to the 1970s, had its roots in British Israelism which had been planted on American evangelical soil in the late 19th century. By the 1960s the Khazar ancestry theory was an article of faith in the Christian Identity movement. The Christian Identity movement has associated two verses from the New Testament, Revelation 2:9 and 3:9 with the Khazars. Jeffrey Kaplan calls these two passages the corner stone of Identity theology. He also reports that Christian Identity literature makes selective references to the Babylonian Talmud, while the works of Francis Parker Yockey and Arthur Koestler work are raised almost to the status of Holy Writ.

The idea has also been promoted by contemporary antisemitic groups on social media, according to the Anti-Defamation League and the American Jewish Committee.

Soviet Union and Russia
The theory was prominent in Soviet antisemitism, gaining a place in Soviet historiography. The theory influenced Soviet historians including Boris Rybakov, Mikhail Artamonov and Lev Gumilyov and was used to support soviet political theory. Artamonov argued that the Khazars had played an important role in the development of Rus’. Rybakov disputed this view, instead regarding the Khazar state as parasitic. Official Soviet views on the Khazars hardened after December 1951 when Pravda published a critical review of Artamonov's work under the pen name P. Ivanov. Rybakov for his part denied that he was Ivanov. It has been speculated that Ivanov was in fact Stalin. In Ivanov's review the Khazars were regarded as parasites and enemies. Ivanov's views became the certified Soviet position.

Lev Gumilyov's theory of ethnogenesis draws heavily on the Khazars theory. For Gumilyov ethnicity was defined by stereotypical behavior which was linked to adaption to the terrain. Jews, he regarded as a parasitic, international urban class. The Jews had dominated the Khazars creating a chimera, subjecting Rus’ to the "Khazar Yoke."

Since the 1970s the term Khazars has entered the Russian nationalist lexicon, it is used as a euphemism for Jews. Vadim V. Kozhinov theorized that the Khazar Yoke was more dangerous to Rus´ than the Tatar Yoke. The Khazars were imagined as a persistent danger to Rus’. After the dissolution of the Soviet Union the theory maintained a role in Russian antisemitism. Contemporary Russian antisemites continue to perpetuate the Khazar myth. Gumilyov and his students work remain popular in Russia. "Khazars" and "ethnic chimera" have become preferred terms for antisemitic Russian chauvinists.

Cults
Aum Shinrikyo is a Japanese doomsday cult. The cult was active in Japan and Russia, with an estimated 10,000 and 30,000 followers respectively. The group's Manual of Fear used the Protocols of the Elders of Zion in addition to other antisemitic material. The manual claimed that the Jews are really Khazars intent on world domination.
The Khazar theory has also become part of the Ascended Masters theology. Hatonn, an extraterrestrial, transmits messages including the complete text of The Protocols of the Elders of Zion. He identifies the authors of The Protocols as Khazars and speaks of false Zionist Jews who have usurped and controlled the true Jews.

Black Hebrew Israelites 
Black Hebrew Israelites promote the antisemitic Khazar conspiracy theory about Jewish origins. Black Hebrew Israelites believe that Jewish people are "imposters", who have "stolen" Black Americans' true racial and religious identity.

See also
 Genetic history of Europe
 Genetic studies on Turkish people
 History of the Jews in Turkey
 Japanese-Jewish common ancestry theory
 Japhetic theory
 Jewish ethnic divisions
 Jewish history
 Kuzari
 List of topics characterized as pseudoscience
 Rus' Khaganate
 Theory of Kashmiri descent from lost tribes of Israel
 Theories of Pashtun origin
 Timeline of the Turkic peoples (500–1300)
 Turkic migration

References

Notes

Citations

Sources

External links
Kutschera, Hugo, Freiherr von, (1909): Die Chasaren; historische Studie
Rory Miller(2020) The anti-Zionist ‘Jewish Khazar’ syndrome in the official British mind
Fishberg, Maurice (1911): The Jews: A Study of Race and Environment.
 The Kievan Letter scan in the Cambridge University Library collection.
 Khazaria.com
 Resources - Medieval Jewish History - The Khazars The Jewish History Resource Center, Project of the Dinur Center for Research in Jewish History, The Hebrew University of Jerusalem
 Khazar Historic Maps
 The Kitab al-Khazari of Judah Hallevi, full English translation at sacred-texts.com
 Ancient lost capital of the Khazar kingdom found

Anti-Zionism
Ashkenazi Jews topics
Antisemitic canards
Conspiracy theories involving Jews
Fringe theories
Jewish genetics
Judaism-related controversies
Khazars
Origin hypotheses of ethnic groups
Population genetics
Pseudohistory
Scientific controversies